Charles Wilkin (born 9 January 1949) is a Kittitian cricketer. He played in one List A and nineteen first-class matches for the Leeward Islands from 1969 to 1977.

See also
 List of Leeward Islands first-class cricketers

References

External links
 

1949 births
Living people
Kittitian cricketers
Leeward Islands cricketers